Nemognatha piazata is a species of blister beetle in the family Meloidae. It is found in North America.

Subspecies
These three subspecies belong to the species Nemognatha piazata:
 Nemognatha piazata bicolor LeConte, 1853
 Nemognatha piazata palliata LeConte, 1853
 Nemognatha piazata piazata (Fabricius, 1798)

References

Further reading

External links

 

Meloidae
Articles created by Qbugbot
Beetles described in 1798